Radin is a surname and given name.

Given name
Radin (Persian: رادین) is also an Ancient Persian given name meaning "gentleman".

Surname
Notable people with the surname include:

Adolph Moses Radin (1848–1909), Polish-American rabbi
Charles Radin (graduated 1965), American mathematician
Dean Radin (born 1952), researcher and author
Furio Radin (born 1950), Croatian politician 
Gary Radin (born 1969), American designer, author and philanthropist
George Radin (died 2013), American computer scientist
Igor Radin (1938–2014), Serbian ice hockey player
Judi Radin (born 1950), American bridge player
Joshua Radin (born 1974), American songwriter
Margaret Jane Radin (born 1941), American legal academic
Max Radin (1880–1950), American legal scholar and author
Milan Radin (born 1991), Serbian footballer
Nikolai Radin (1872–1935), Russian stage and silent film actor and director
Paul Radin (1883–1959), American anthropologist
Roy Radin (1949–1983), American show business promoter 
Zvjezdan Radin (born 1943), Croatian footballer

Other uses
Radin Inten II is a National Hero of Indonesia.

Gost Radin (Radin Butković) was gost of Bosnian Church during the 14th century in medieval Bosnia.

See also

Radin Mas, Singapore
Radun, Belarus, sometimes Radin

References